Double Glacier is an  long glacier in the Kenai Peninsula Borough of Alaska, located  west-northwest of Kenai. As its name suggests, Double Glacier is divided into two lobes.

Double Glacier is the largest glacier contained within Lake Clark National Park with an area of 137 km2 and is in retreat.  In the 2009 Redout volcano eruption the entire glacier was covered by ash.

Double Glacier Volcano lava dome complex of Pleistocene age forms a nunatak in Double Glacier. K–Ar dating of the complex indicates that it formed 627,000 to 887,000 years ago.

See also
List of glaciers in the United States
List of volcanoes in the United States

References

Glaciers of Alaska
Glaciers of Kenai Peninsula Borough, Alaska
Volcanoes of Alaska
Pleistocene lava domes